German submarine U-583 was a Type VIIC U-boat of Nazi Germany's Kriegsmarine during World War II.

She carried out no patrols and sank no ships. She was sunk after a collision with another U-boat in the Baltic Sea on 15 November 1941.

Design
German Type VIIC submarines were preceded by the shorter Type VIIB submarines. U-583 had a displacement of  when at the surface and  while submerged. She had two shafts and two  propellers.

U-583 was fitted with five  torpedo tubes (four fitted at the bow and one at the stern), fourteen torpedoes, one  SK C/35 naval gun, 220 rounds, and a  C/30 anti-aircraft gun. The boat had a complement of between forty-four and sixty.

Service history
The submarine was laid down on 1 October 1940 at Blohm & Voss, Hamburg as yard number 559, launched on 26 June 1941 and commissioned on 14 August under the command of Kapitänleutnant Heinrich Ratsch. She served with the 5th U-boat Flotilla from 14 August 1941. Forty-five men died; there were no survivors.

References

Bibliography

External links

German Type VIIC submarines
U-boats commissioned in 1941
U-boats sunk in 1941
U-boats sunk in collisions
World War II submarines of Germany
1941 ships
Ships built in Hamburg
Ships lost with all hands
Maritime incidents in November 1941